Ana Vučković Denčić (born 16 November 1984) is Serbian author, screenwriter and radio host. She has published one collection of stories and four novels, two of which were among finalists for the prestigious NIN Award (Epoha lipsa juče in 2003 and Yugoslav in 2019). Vučković graduated in dramaturgy at the Belgrade University of Arts. She is currently employed at the Radio Belgrade, and is a columnist of the City Magazine.

Bibliography
Epoha lipsa juče (2003), novel
Lust 'n' dust (2004), novel
Plišani soliter (2007), collection of stories
Surfing Srbija (2012), novel
Yugoslav (2019), novel

References

Sources

About books

1984 births
Writers from Belgrade
Serbian novelists
Serbian radio personalities
Living people
Serbian women novelists